Ebru Destan (born 24 September 1977) is a Turkish singer, actress, and model.

Biography
Ebru is one of the most famous podium models in Turkey. She has also acted in many films like Abuzer Kadayıf, Yeni Hayat, Zor Hedef, Can Ayşecik. Ebru became a singer in 2005 and became successful. She has three music albums called Sözümü Yemedim, Ayrılık Soğuk İklim and 3 Vakte Kadar. She competed in the reality show Survivor: Ünlüler vs. Gönüllüler as part of the Celebrities (Ünlüler) team. She reached the top 6, only to be voted out in an SMS head-to-head with her close friend Özge Ulusoy.

She dated Galatasaray S.K.'s former defender and Turkish international Vedat İnceefe over three years and Beşiktaş J.K. defender İbrahim Toraman.

Albums 
 Sözümü Yemedim (2005)
 Ayrılık Soğuk İklim (2007)
 3 Vakte Kadar (2008)

Filmography 
 Cennet'in Gözyaşları (2017–2018) Özlem
 Yahşi Cazibe (TV series) (2010) (Supporting character)
 Para=Dolar (2008)   
 Teberik Şanssız (2005)   
 Aliye (TV series) (2004) (Supporting character)  
 Hayat Bilgisi (TV series) (2003) (Supporting character)  
 Yeni Hayat (TV series) (2001)   
 Aşkına Eşkıya (TV series) (2001)    
 Abuzer Kadayıf (2000)    
 Canlı Hayat (TV film) (2000)   
 Zor Hedef (TV series) (2000)   
 Onun Dünyası (2000)   
 Kurt Kapanı (TV series) (2000)  
 Kimsecikler (TV series) (1999)   
 Ayşecik (TV series) (1999) (Mısra)  
 Baba (TV series) (1999)   
 Şampiyon (TV film) (1999)   
 Hesabım Bitmedi (TV series) (1998)   
 Unutabilsem (TV series) (1998)   
 İlişkiler (TV series) (1997)    
 Can Ayşecik (TV series) (1997)    
 Bu Sevda Bitmez (TV series) (1996)  
 Mahallenin Muhtarları (TV series) (1992)

References

External links
Official webpage

Living people
Turkish female models
Turkish pop singers
Association footballers' wives and girlfriends
1977 births
Musicians from İzmir
21st-century Turkish singers
21st-century Turkish women singers